ESV is an abbreviation of the English Standard Version, a translation of the Bible in contemporary English.

ESV may also refer to:
 Emergency Shutdown Valve
 Employer-supported volunteering, a form of corporate volunteering
 End-systolic volume
 ESV, a brand of Cadillac Escalade
 Exact sequence variant, also called an amplicon sequence variant
 Experimental Safety Vehicle
 M1132 Engineer Squad Vehicle